A matrix of the United Nations explosives shipping classification system and examples of typical materials. Each classification consists of a Sub Class Number that indicates the type of hazard and a Compatibility group suffix describing which types of product may inhabit the same means of containment.

Classes

Compatibility Groups

See also 
 Air travel with firearms and ammunition
 List of UN numbers 0301 to 0400

References

Links 
INTERNATIONAL AMMUNITION TECHNICAL GUIDELINE (IATG) 01.50, UN explosive hazard classification system and codes, Second edition, 2015-02-01
Transport Canada, Transportation of Dangerous Goods Regulations
Transport Canada, Statutory Instruments (Regulations) SOR/2008-34
Australian Code for the Transport of Explosives by Road or Rail - Third Edition

Ship management